Modiri Marumo (born 6 July 1976) is a Botswanan former footballer who played as a goalkeeper.

Club career
Born in Gaborone, Marumo began his career with Botswana Defence Force. He signed for Egyptian side Haras El Hodood in February 2008, becoming the first Botswanan player to play in Egypt's top division. He moved to South Africa in August 2010, signing with Bay United. He ended his career with Polokwane City, also in South Africa.

International career
Marumo earned 85 caps for the Botswana national team between 1997 and 2015. In January 2012 he was one of a number of national team players who went on strike over pay. He initially retired from the national team in February 2012, following the 2012 Africa Cup of Nations, but returned to the national team set up in July 2012. He is the only ever goalkeeper to have been sent off in the duration of a penalty shootout.

References

1976 births
Living people
People from Gaborone
Botswana footballers
Botswana international footballers
Botswana Defence Force XI F.C. players
Haras El Hodoud SC players
Polokwane City F.C. players
Bay United F.C. players
Association football goalkeepers
Botswana expatriate footballers
Botswana expatriate sportspeople in Egypt
Expatriate footballers in Egypt
Botswana expatriate sportspeople in South Africa
Expatriate soccer players in South Africa
2012 Africa Cup of Nations players